Landtag elections in the Free State of Schaumburg-Lippe (Freistaat Schaumburg-Lippe) during the Weimar Republic were held at 3-year intervals between 1919 and 1931. Results with regard to the total vote, the percentage of the vote won and the number of seats allocated to each party are presented in the tables below. On 31 March 1933, the sitting Landtag was dissolved by the Nazi-controlled central government and reconstituted to reflect the distribution of seats in the national Reichstag. The Landtag subsequently was formally abolished as a result of the "Law on the Reconstruction of the Reich" of 30 January 1934 which replaced the German federal system with a unitary state.

1919
The 1919 Schaumburg-Lippe state election was held on 16 February 1919 to elect the 15 members of the Landtag.

1922
The 1922 Schaumburg-Lippe state election was held on 23 April 1922 to elect the 15 members of the Landtag.

1925
The 1925 Schaumburg-Lippe state election was held on 3 May 1925 to elect the 15 members of the Landtag.

1928
The 1928 Schaumburg-Lippe state election was held on 29 April 1928 to elect the 15 members of the Landtag.

1931
The 1931 Schaumburg-Lippe state election was held on 3 May 1931 to elect the 15 members of the Landtag.

References

Elections in the Weimar Republic
Elections in Lower Saxony
Schaumburg-Lippe
Schaumburg-Lippe
Schaumburg-Lippe
Schaumburg-Lippe
Schaumburg-Lippe